Power of Soul may refer to:
 Power of Soul (band), a soul/funk band from Argentina
 Power of Soul (album), an album by Idris Muhammad
 Power of Soul, 1968 album by Swedish singer Jerry Williams
 Power of Soul, also known as Power to Love, 1970 song by Jimi Hendrix, first published on Band of Gypsys

See also
 Soul Power (disambiguation)